Dariusz Mioduski (born 1 January 1964) is a Polish attorney, sports director, Legia Warsaw owner and president, European Club Association Executive Board member.

In the years 2007–2013 he was the president of the Kulczyk Investments group.

In 22 March 2017, he purchased the remaining forty percent of the club to become the single owner of the club from Bogusław Leśnodorski.

References 

1964 births
Harvard Business School alumni
Living people
20th-century Polish lawyers